Clearlake Capital (Clearlake) is a private equity firm founded in 2006 that focuses on the technology, industrial and consumer sectors. The firm is headquartered in Santa Monica with affiliates in Dallas, London and Dublin.  

The firm is the owner of Chelsea F.C. where in May 2022, it acquired 60% of the club’s outstanding shares.

Background
Clearlake Capital was founded in 2006 by Steven Chang, Behdad Eghbali and José E. Feliciano. The strategy was to shift between buyouts and distressed securities depending on economic conditions. This allowed the firm to take advantage of the 2007–2008 financial crisis to acquire distressed securities and then sell them for a profit after recovery.

In 2015, Chang left the firm leaving Eghbali and Feliciano as the remaining managing partners. 

In May 2018, Clearlake sold a minority stake of up to 20% of its shares to Dyal Capital, Petershill Partners and Landmark Partners. The purpose of the sale was to fund the creation of a credit unit.

In June 2020, Clearlake acquired a majority interest in WhiteStar Asset Management from Pine Brook Road Partners. WhiteStar Asset Management serves as the credit platform of Clearlake.   

In recent years Clearlake has become the biggest user of “GP-led secondaries”. It is a technique where Clearlake will find another private equity firm to buy a large portion of one of its existing investments and then offer investors a chance to sell at a new valuation or roll their stake into a new fund that will hold the investment for a few more years. It discovered this technique during the COVID-19 pandemic when it sold shares of software company Ivanti to TA Associates in August 2020 at a valuation of $2 billion that generated a large windfall gain. Many investors chose to roll their holdings instead. In 2021, Charlesbank Capital Partners invested in Ivanti at a valuation of $4 billion.

Funds

Notable deals 
In 2014, Clearlake acquired the women's clothing company Ashley Stewart for $18 million after it had recently filed for bankruptcy. After the company underwent significant restructuring including cost-cutting, Clearlake sold the company to Invus Group for more than $140 million in 2016.

In 2015, Clearlake took a controlling stake in Syncsort. In 2016 Clearlake, took a controlling stake in Vision Solutions. In 2017, Clearlake sold both companies to Centerbridge Partners for $1.26 billion and were merged. In 2020 the merged company rebranded to Precisely. In 2021, Clearlake and TA Associates reacquired Precisely for $3.5 billion. 

In October 2021, the firm acquired Cornerstone OnDemand a NASDAQ listed software company for $5.2 billion and took the company private.

On May 30, 2022, a consortium of investors co-led by Clearlake and Todd Boehly acquired Chelsea F.C. for $3 billion. Clearlake, which owns about 60% of Chelsea, would share joint control and equal governance of the club with Boehly.

Notable investments

 Ashley Stewart
 Chelsea F.C.
 Constant Contact
 Cornerstone OnDemand
 DigiCert
 EagleView Technologies
 Endurance International Group
 Intertape Polymer Group
 Ivanti
 JetSmarter
 Kofax
 Lytx
 NetMotion Software
 Perforce
 Precisely
 Quest Software
 Shavlik Technologies
 THQ
 Wellness Pet Company

References

External links
 
 

2006 establishments in California
Financial services companies of the United States
Financial services companies established in 2006
Companies based in Santa Monica, California
Private equity firms of the United States